Brarudi S.A., also known by its French name Brasseries et Limonaderies du Burundi, is the largest brewer and soft beverage company in the Republic of Burundi.

History
The history of Brarudi goes back to 1955 when the management of the breweries of the Belgian Congo, then under the management of Brasseries de Leopoldville (now Bralima Brewery), decided to build a brewery in the Eastern region to server Ruanda-Urundi and Eastern Congo. The city of Usumbura (now Bujumbura), on the northern shores of Lake Tanganyika, was selected to house the new brewery whose name was Brasserie du Rwanda-Urundi. The brewery became operational December 23, 1955 and began producing Primus Beer.

In November 1957, Bralima started the construction work for a second brewery to be located in Gisenyi on the northern shores of Lake Kivu under the name Brasseries et Limonaderies du Rwanda.

Upon independence, Bralima was incorporated in Congo Léopoldville, Brarudi in Burundi and Bralirwa in Rwanda.

In 1966, Brarudi diversified into the production of soft drinks. This was through the brewer's partnership with The Coca-Cola Company making it a bottler for Coca-Cola products. A soft beverages plant was opened in Gitega for this purpose.

In 1975, the Government of Burundi acquired 40% control of Brarudi while Banque Bruxelles Lambert (BBL) retained its 60% shareholding. BBL exited Brarudi in 1982 through a selling its 60% stake to Heineken, a Dutch brewing conglomerate. This made Brarudi a subsidiary of Heineken.

Ownership
The shares of stock of the company are privately held. The ownership of the company stock is as depicted in the table below:

Brands
The brands manufactured by Brarudi include:

Beers

Soft drinks

See also

References

External links 
 Bralirwa Homepage
 Heineken Homepage 

Drink companies of Burundi
Food and drink companies established in 1955
1955 establishments in Ruanda-Urundi
Heineken subsidiaries
Breweries of Africa
Coca-Cola bottlers